The State of the Nation is a speech made annually by the Prime Minister of Luxembourg to the national legislature, the Chamber of Deputies.  It covers the economic, social, and financial state of the country, and is followed by a debate in the Chamber on those issues.

External links
  Government of Luxembourg official webpage on Discours sur l'état de la Nation

Government of Luxembourg
Chamber of Deputies (Luxembourg)
Speeches by heads of state
State ritual and ceremonies